Arthur Osborne (1906 – May 8, 1970) was an English writer on spirituality and mysticism, and an influential disciple and biographer of Ramana Maharshi.

Biography
Osborne studied history for two years at Christ Church, Oxford, but left the university dissatisfied with the academic culture. In 1936, he set out on a spiritual quest, which eventually brought him to Ramana Maharshi in 1942. From 1964, Osborne served as the founding editor of Mountain Path, a journal published by Ramanasramam, the ashram founded by the devotees of Ramana Maharshi. He died on 8 May 1970 in Bangalore, aged 63.

Works
Osborne published several books on Ramana Maharshi, including Ramana Maharshi and the path of self-knowledge, one of the principle publications on Ramana Maharshi. Other publications include a biography of Shirdi Sai Baba. Thirty years after Osborne's death, his autobiography was discovered among his papers and published by Ramanasramam as My Life and Quest.

Selected bibliography
 
 
 
 Arthur Osborne The rhythm of history 1959 Arthur Osborne  Indica Varanasi

References

Sources

 
  

1906 births
1970 deaths
English biographers
English writers
English spiritual writers
Mysticism scholars